The Laughing Cavalier  is a 1917 British silent adventure film directed by A. V. Bramble and Eliot Stannard and starring Mercy Hatton, Edward O'Neill and George Bellamy. It is an adaptation of the 1913 novel The Laughing Cavalier by Baroness Emmuska Orczy.

Cast
 Mercy Hatton - Gilda Beresteyn
 George Bellamy - Lord Stoutenberg
 Edward O'Neill - Governor Beresteyn
 A.V. Bramble - Diogenes
 Frederick Sargent - Nicholas Beresteyn
 Eva Westlake - Lady Stoutenberg

References

External links

1917 films
1910s English-language films
1917 adventure films
British silent feature films
Films directed by A. V. Bramble
British black-and-white films
Films based on works by Emma Orczy
British adventure films
Silent adventure films
1910s British films